The Hungarians in Ukraine (tr. uhortsi v Ukraini) number 156,600 people according to the Ukrainian census of 2001 and are the third largest national minority in the country. Hungarians are largely concentrated in the Zakarpattia Oblast (particularly in Berehove Raion and Berehove city), where they form the largest minority at 12.1% of the population (12.7% when native language is concerned). In the area along the Ukrainian border with Hungary (the Tisza River valley), Hungarians form the majority.

Concentrated primarily in Zakarpattia (Trans-Carpathian), in Hungarian those Hungarians are referred to as Kárpátaljai magyarok (Transcarpathian Hungarians), while Zakarpattia is referred to as Kárpátalja.

History
Today's territory of Zakarpattia was part of the Kingdom of Hungary since its foundation in the year 1000. From 1867, Hungary was a constituent part of the Austro-Hungarian Empire, until the latter's demise at the end of World War I. The Zakarpattia region was briefly part of the short-lived West Ukrainian National Republic in 1918 and occupied by the Kingdom of Romania at end of that year. It was later recaptured by Hungary in the summer of 1919. After the defeat of the remaining Hungarian armies in 1919, the Paris Peace Conference concluded the Treaty of Trianon that awarded Zakarpattia to the newly formed Czechoslovakia as the Subcarpathian Rus, one of the four main regions of Czechoslovakia, the others being Bohemia, Moravia and Slovakia.

During the World War II German occupation of Czechoslovakia, the southern, Hungarian majority part of the region was awarded to Hungary under the First Vienna Award in 1938. The remaining portion was constituted as an autonomous region of the short-lived Second Czechoslovak Republic. After the occupation of Bohemia and Moravia on March 15, 1939 and the Slovak declaration of an independent state, Ruthenia declared its independence (Republic of Carpatho-Ukraine) but it was immediately occupied and later annexed by Hungary.

When the Soviet Army crossed the pre-1938 borders of Czechoslovakia in 1944, Soviet authorities refused to allow Czechoslovak governmental officials to resume control over the region, and in June 1945, President Edvard Beneš formally signed a treaty ceding the area to the Soviet Union. It was then incorporated into the Ukrainian SSR. After the break-up of the Soviet Union, it became part of independent Ukraine as the Zakarpattia Oblast.

Situation of Hungarians in independent Ukraine

Hungary was the first country to recognize Ukraine's independence. Árpád Göncz, who was president of Hungary at the time, was invited to visit the region, and a joint declaration, followed in December 1991 by a state treaty, acknowledged that the ethnic Hungarian minority had collective as well as individual rights. The treaty provided for the preservation of their ethnic, cultural, linguistic, and religious identities; education at all levels in the mother tongue; and the ethnic Hungarians' participation in local authorities charged with minority affairs.

It is quite common among the Hungarian minority in Ukraine holds besides Ukrainian citizenship also Hungarian citizenship, although currently Ukrainian law does not recognise dual citizenship.

In the 2014 European Parliament election in Hungary Andrea Bocskor who lives in Ukraine (in the city Berehove) was elected into the European Parliament (for Fidesz). Hence, Bocskor, who is ethnically Hungarian and a citizen of Hungary, became the first elected member of the European Parliament who additionally holds a Ukrainian passport.

Since 2017, the Hungary–Ukraine relations rapidly deteriorated over the issue of Ukraine's education law. Ukraine's 2017 education law makes Ukrainian the required language of primary education in state schools from grade five. László Brenzovics, the only ethnic Hungarian in the Supreme Council of Ukraine, said that "There is a sort of purposeful policy, which besides narrowing the rights of all minorities, tries to portray the Hungarian minority as the enemy in Ukrainian public opinion." The situation since then has been ongoing in problem, as Hungary continues to block Ukraine's attempt to integrate within the EU and NATO over disputes on minority rights.

Minority rights

Residents in seven of Mukachivskyi Raion's villages have the option to learn the Hungarian language in a school or home school environment. The first Hungarian College in Ukraine is in Berehovo, the II. Rákoczi Ferenc College. Currently there are 71 Hungarian Schools in Ukraine with 16,000 enrolled students.

Organisation

The Hungarian Democratic Federation in Ukraine (UMDSZ) is the only nationally registered Hungarian organization. It was established in October 1991 by the Hungarian Cultural Federation in Transcarpathia (KMKSZ, which has suspended its membership since 1995), the Cultural Federation of Hungarians in Lviv, and the Association of Hungarians in Kyiv. The Hungarian Cultural Federation in Transcarpathia is associated with the political party KMKSZ – Hungarian Party in Ukraine, which was established in February 2005. In March 2005, the Ukrainian Ministry of Justice also registered the Hungarian Democratic Party in Ukraine upon the initiative of the UMDSZ. Also Zoltán Lengyel was elected as mayor of Mukachevo after the election on 1 December 2008. UMDSZ also won city municipalities of Berehove, Vynohradiv and Tiachiv in this election.

Notable personalities
 Yozhef Sabo (József Szabó)
 Vasyl Rats (László Rácz)
 Ishtvan Sekech (István Szekecs)
 Yuriy Habovda
 Ernest Kesler (Ernő Keszler)
 Robert Hehedosh

Demographics

The following data is according to the Ukrainian census of 2001.

Cultural heritage
Hungarian cultural heritage in Ukraine includes medieval castles:

See also
 Demographics of Ukraine
 Hungary–Ukraine relations
 Hungarian Greek Catholic Church

References

External links
Website of the Cultural Federation of Hungarians in Subcarpathia
Website of the Hungarian Democratic Federation in Ukraine

 
Ethnic groups in Ukraine
Ukraine